50719 Elizabethgriffin, provisional designation , is a stony Maria asteroid and exceptionally slow rotator from the central region of the asteroid belt, approximately  in diameter. It was discovered on 1 March 2000, by astronomers with the Catalina Sky Survey at Mount Lemmon Observatory, Arizona, United States. It was named for Canadian astronomer .

Classification and orbit 

The stony S-type asteroid is a member of the Maria family, located in the Eunomia region in the intermediate main-belt. It orbits the Sun in the central main-belt at a distance of 2.2–2.9 AU once every 4 years and 2 months (1,517 days; semi-major axis of 2.58 AU). Its orbit has an eccentricity of 0.13 and an inclination of 14° with respect to the ecliptic. A first precovery was taken at Lowell Observatory (LONEOS) in 1998, extending the asteroid's observation arc by 2 years prior to its discovery.

Numbering and naming 

This minor planet was numbered by the Minor Planet Center on 20 November 2002. It was named after Elizabeth Griffin (born 1942) a Canadian astronomer who studies binary stars spectroscopically. She has been an advocate for the preservation and digitization of astronomic photographic plates. The official  was published by the Minor Planet Center on 6 April 2019.

Physical characteristics

Slow rotator 

In August 2010, a rotational lightcurve of Elizabethgriffin was obtained from photometric observations by astronomers at the Palomar Transient Factory in California. It gave an exceptionally long rotation period of 1256 hours with a brightness variation of 0.42 magnitude. This makes the asteroid the 5th slowest rotating minor planet known to exist.

Diameter and albedo 

According to the surveys carried out by the NEOWISE mission of NASA's Wide-field Infrared Survey Explorer, Elizabethgriffin measures 3.3 kilometers in diameter and its surface has an albedo of 0.37, while the Collaborative Asteroid Lightcurve Link assumes a standard albedo for stony asteroids of 0.21 and calculates a diameter of 3.4 kilometers with an absolute magnitude of 14.65.

References

External links 
 Asteroid Lightcurve Database (LCDB), query form (info )
 Dictionary of Minor Planet Names, Google books
 Asteroids and comets rotation curves, CdR – Observatoire de Genève, Raoul Behrend
 Discovery Circumstances: Numbered Minor Planets (50001)-(55000) – Minor Planet Center
 
 

50719
50719
50719
Named minor planets
50719
20000301